Dilip Saikia is an Indian politician. He was elected to the Lok Sabha, the lower house of the Parliament of India, from Mangaldoi in Assam in the 2019 Indian general election as a member of the Bharatiya Janata Party. He is currently the national General secretary of Bharatiya Janata Party.
He is a former state Secretary and state organising secretary of Akhil Bharatiya Vidyarthi Parishad ABVP Assam Pradesh.

References

External links
 
 Official biographical sketch in Parliament of India website

India MPs 2019–present
Lok Sabha members from Assam
Living people
1973 births
Bharatiya Janata Party politicians from Assam